Shama Ahanta East Metropolitan District is a former district that was located in Western Region, Ghana. Originally created as a metropolitan district assembly in 1988 when it was known as Sekondi Takoradi Metropolitan Authority Council; which was later renamed as Shama Ahanta East Metropolitan District in 1994. However, on 29 February 2008, it was split off into two new districts: Sekondi Takoradi Metropolitan District (capital: Sekondi-Takoradi) and Shama District (capital: Shama). The metropolis was located in the southeast part of Western Region and had Sekondi-Takoradi as its capital town.

Sources
 
 GhanaDistricts.com

References

Districts of the Western Region (Ghana)